Pueblo Nuevo is a ward of the National Assembly of People's Power in the municipality of Matanzas, Matanzas, Cuba. It used to be one of the three neighborhoods of Matanzas.

References

Matanzas
Populated places in Matanzas Province